"Don't Be Sad" is a song by alt-country band Whiskeytown, from their album, Pneumonia.  It was co-written by Ryan Adams, Mike Daly, and James Iha (Smashing Pumpkins), and issued as a single to radio in 2001.

Ryan Adams says this about the track: "I think there's a duality in that song. I think on one hand, it's saying, 'Hang on, we'll get through this,' but deep down, we know we're not going to get through it at all. I don't know. Damn, that song just kinda says it all, doesn't it?"

Track listing

Credits

Musicians
 Ryan Adams — Guitars, vocals, piano & harmonica
 Caitlin Cary — Fiddle & backing vocals
 Mike Daly — Guitars, pedal steel, lap steel, dulcimer, mandocello, mandolin, keyboards & backing vocals
 Brad Rice — Guitars
 Jennifer Condos — Bass
 Mike Santoro — Bass
 Richard Causon — Keyboards
 James Iha - Guitars & Backing vocals
 Tommy Stinson — Guitar & dobro
 James Jumbo Aumonier — Celeste
 Ethan Johns — Drums, bass, mandolin, mandocello, keyboards, percussion & guitars

Production credits
 Produced by Ethan Johns
 Engineered by Trina Shoemaker
 Mixed & engineered by Ethan Johns
 Recorded at Dreamland Studios & House Of Blues Studios
 Mixed at The Sound Factory
 Mastered by Doug Sax & Robert Hadley at the Mastering Lab, Hollywood, CA

References

Whiskeytown songs
2001 singles
Songs written by James Iha
Songs written by Ryan Adams
2001 songs
Lost Highway Records singles
Songs written by Mike Daly